The U.S. International (officially Yonex / K&D Graphics International) is an open international badminton tournament held in Orange County, California, United States. This tournament previously a Grand Prix level. In 2016, this tournament downgraded to BWF International Challenge level. In 2017, the tournament has both International Challenge and International Series event.

Previous winners

  BWF Grand Prix
  BWF International Challenge
  BWF International Series

References

External links
 Orange Country Badminton Club
 2014 Results
 2015 Results

Sports competitions in California
Badminton tournaments in the United States
Sports in Orange County, California